Description of Kingdom of Georgia was written by Vakhushti Bagrationi. The full name of the work is "Description of Kingdom of Georgia, its habits and canons". The work was completed on 20 October 1745 in Moscow. The work thoroughly describes the geography of Georgia, its regions and peoples, and narrates the history of Georgia from its origin to the first half of the 18th century. The work was inscribed on UNESCO's Memory of the World Register in 2013.

References 

Historiography of Georgia (country)
18th-century history books
Memory of the World Register
1745 books
Kingdom of Georgia